Shadow Fight is a series of fighting video games developed by Nekki. Each game is set in the Far East, involving martial arts action between combatants that are typically silhouettes.  The first installment was initially released as a Facebook game, before two sequels made available as free-to-play mobile games.

Games

Shadow Fight

Shadow Fight was a Facebook-based fighting game developed by Nekki. It was released on February 12, 2011. In online battles, players play against each-other, utilizing magic spells, long-range weapons, and hand-to-hand combat tools, or through unarmed fighting. Shadow Fight was available on Facebook in English, Russian, German, French, Italian, Portuguese, and Turkish.

The game continued to be available until a few months before the release of Shadow Fight 3.  On August 16, 2017, the developers announced on Twitter that the Shadow Fight servers would shut down on September 29, 2017, and that in-game transactions would no longer be accepted. Players who opened the game received 900,000 rubies as a farewell gift. Due to popular demand however, Nekki delayed the shutdown by one month to October 27, 2017.

Shadow Fight 2

Shadow Fight 2 is the second installment of the trilogy. Released worldwide in 2014 for mobile devices and ported to computers and eighth-generation consoles, the sequel is more story-driven than its predecessor. The plot follows a warrior known only as "Shadow", who was once a legendary warrior, renowned for never losing a battle. While seeking a worthy opponent, Shadow accidentally opened the Gate of Shadows, a pathway to another realm, unleashing powerful demons into his world. Reduced to a faceless silhouette, Shadow now fights to reclaim his lost honor and physical body. 

The game consists of multiple acts, each of which involves the player leveling up by taking part in battles against AI-controlled opponents, earning currency to upgrade Shadow's arsenal. While the first acts revolve around Shadow battling the demons he unleashed upon the world and looking for a way to seal back the Gates of Shadows, the final part of the game sees Shadow venturing into the Shadow World, where he must defeat an alien warlord called Titan. The game also includes a multiplayer mode, where rather than fighting each other, players must work together to defeat various bosses in the Underworld.

Shadow Fight 3

Shadow Fight 3 is an Action-RPG fighting game. It was announced in April 2017 with an expected release in the fall of the same year. After extensive beta-testing, the game was released in Canada on July 17, 2017, in India on October 27, 2017, and worldwide on November 16, 2017.  It is playable in many languages.

Unlike its predecessors, Shadow Fight 3 does not represent fighters as silhouettes. Instead, they are rendered as lifelike three-dimensional characters in a richly animated environment. Players build up a gauge during combat, which allows them to temporarily enter 'Shadow Form'. This allows them to use shadow abilities. Shadow abilities are based on the player's current gear and faction. Items are acquired in the form of collectible cards that can be earned or purchased. 

The game takes place years after the events of Shadow Fight 2, and revolves around a conflict between three distinct factions. The player starts the game as a member of Legion, which uses mostly European weapons like swords and hammers and has slow but powerful attacks. Later, they escape to Dynasty, which has a faster, more acrobatic fighting style and uses weapons from around Asia like Nunchaku and Guandao. The final main faction is Heralds, who have more precise attacks and mostly Japanese weaponry like Naginata and Katana (of which two variants exist: normal Katana and ones used in a manner similar to Iaidō).

References

External links
Official website
Shadow fight Download
Video game franchises
Video games developed in Russia